Alluri Sitharama Raju district, also known as Alluri district and by its initials as ASR district, is a district in the Indian state of Andhra Pradesh. The headquarters of the district is located at Paderu. Named after Alluri Sitarama Raju, a revolutionary in the Indian independence movement who hailed from the region, the district was effective since 4 April 2022 and became one of the twenty-six districts in the state. The district famous for its scenic beauty , falls in the lap of Eastern Ghats.

History 
In July 2019, on the occasion of Alluri Sitarama Raju's 122nd birth anniversary, state Tourism Minister Avanthi Srinivasa Rao said a newly formed district would be named after Alluri Sitarama Raju.

The district was proposed on 26 January 2022 by the Y. S. Jagan Mohan Reddy's government as part of a reorganisation of all the existing 13 districts in the state to form 26 districts in total. Final notification was issued by the Government of Andhra Pradesh on 3 April 2022 and the district was effective from 4 April 2022. The administrative headquarters of the district is located at Paderu. It would be formed from Paderu revenue division of Visakhapatnam district and Rampachodavaram revenue division of East Godavari district.

Etymology

This district is named after Alluri Sitarama Raju, a revolutionary in the Indian independence movement who came from the region.

Geography
This district borders with North of Malkangiri district and Koraput district of Odisha state,North West of Sukma district of Chhattisgarh state & Bhadradri Kothagudem district of Telangana state. And this district is surrounded by South of Kakinada district, South East of Anakapalli district, South West of Eluru district & East Godavari district.

Administrative divisions 

The district has three revenue divisions, namely Paderu, Rampachodavaram and Chinturu, each headed by a Sub-Collector. These revenue divisions are divided into 22 mandals.

Mandals 

There are 11 mandals in Paderu, 7 mandals in Rampachodavaram and 4 mandals in Chinturu revenue divisions. The 22 mandals under their revenue divisions are listed below:

Politics 

There are one parliamentary and 3 assembly constituencies in Alluri Sitharama Raju district. The parliamentary constituencies are 
The assembly constituencies are

Cities and towns

Demographics 
At the time of the 2011 census, the district had a population of 953,960, of which 37,973 (3.98%) live in urban areas. Alluri Sitarama Raju district has a sex ratio of 1046 females per 1000 males and a literacy rate of 42.34%. Scheduled Castes and Scheduled Tribes made up 2.49% and 82.67% of the population respectively. The tribals are a mix of peoples: Konda Dora, Khond, Konda Reddy, Konda Kapu, Koya, Parang Proja, Valmiki. Most of the population, over 80%, speaks distinct dialects of Telugu or Odia as their first language, with large minorities speaking Konda Dora, Kuvi and Koya.

The vast majority of people are Hindu.

At the time of the 2011 census, 70.27% of the population spoke Telugu, 11.43% Odia, 7.63% Koya, 7.09% Kuvi and 2.02% Konda as their first language.

References 

Districts of Andhra Pradesh
2022 establishments in Andhra Pradesh
Alluri Sitharama Raju district